Carl Andrew Lahti (born 1967) is a United States Navy rear admiral and submarine warfare officer who is dual-hatted as the 36th commander of the United States Naval Forces Japan and commander of Navy Region Japan since July 14, 2021. As CNFJ/CNRJ, Lahti is responsible for providing shore readiness to U.S. naval forces in Japan and maritime support to the American forward presence in Japan as well as cooperation with the Japan Maritime Self-Defense Force to promote regional stability and deter aggression. He most recently served as the 91st Commandant of Naval District Washington and deputy commander of the Joint Force Headquarters National Capital Region from June 2018 to June 2021.

Raised in Buffalo, New York, Lahti graduated from the United States Naval Academy in 1989 with a B.S. degree in systems engineering. He later earned an M.S. degree in electrical engineering from the Naval Postgraduate School in 1996 and an M.A. degree in national security and strategic studies from the Naval War College.

In March 2022, he was nominated for promotion to rear admiral. The promotion became effective on April 1, 2022.

Awards and decorations

References

Date of birth missing (living people)
1967 births
Living people
Place of birth missing (living people)
People from Buffalo, New York
Military personnel from New York (state)
United States Naval Academy alumni
Naval Postgraduate School alumni
Naval War College alumni
United States submarine commanders
Recipients of the Meritorious Service Medal (United States)
Recipients of the Legion of Merit
United States Navy admirals
Recipients of the Defense Superior Service Medal